"There Is No Arizona" is a song co-written and recorded by Australian country music artist Jamie O'Neal.  It was released in August 2000 as the first single from O'Neal's debut album, Shiver.  The song reached Number One on the Billboard Hot Country Singles & Tracks (now Hot Country Songs) charts.  It was written by O'Neal, Lisa Drew and Shaye Smith.

Content
The narrator talks about how a man leaves his lady to settle in Arizona, and promises to send for her (the narrator) when he has things set up. Time goes by and she gets one postcard with no return address but nothing more.  Her friends keep asking her when she's going.  She tries to hold out hope that he'll come back or send for her.  Finally, she realizes that the dream of having a better life with him in Arizona is never going to come true. The wonderful, love-filled paradise she had hoped for was just a lie. Her vision of Arizona does not exist.

Music video
The music video was directed by Lawrence Carroll and premiered in mid-2000. It starts with O'Neal sitting on a bench in a desert with a postcard in her hand singing. She eventually tears up the postcard and the pieces blow away in the wind. Once the second chorus hits, a tarp behind her is revealed, and behind her is a skyscraper (actually the Empire State Building) in New York City. She then is seen walking through NYC (including sitting on another bench, standing in the heart of Times Square, in front of the Flatiron Building, and walking through a small park, all while others are passing her by. As the song ends, she (in Times Square again) simply turns and walks away.

Chart performance
"There Is No Arizona" debuted at number 69 on the U.S. Billboard Hot Country Singles & Tracks for the chart week of August 12, 2000.

Year-end charts

Notes

References

2000 debut singles
2000 songs
Jamie O'Neal songs
Songs written by Jamie O'Neal
Songs written by Shaye Smith
Song recordings produced by Keith Stegall
Mercury Nashville singles
Songs about Arizona